Earth to Ned is an American television show on Disney+ that streamed in 20 episodes from September 4, 2020, to January 1, 2021. It stars Ned, an alien from outer space, who comes to Earth on a mission to invade it, but upon arriving, falls in love with its pop culture and instead hosts a late night talk show to meet and be entertained by Earth's celebrities.

Premise
Sent by his father, the admiral of the fleet, to conquer the planet, Ned arrives on Earth only to become enchanted with Earth's celebrities. Instead of invading the planet, Ned buries his spaceship deep below Earth's crust and abducts celebrities by beaming them to his ship for interviews in the style of a late night talk show. Ned serves as the host, and the show features Cornelius as an alien sidekick from a race of aliens called Cornisians that Ned's species had previously conquered, and an unspecified number of much smaller alien beings called CLODs (short for Cloned Living Organism of Destruction) who speak in gibberish and scare the guests. Ned and Cornelius broadcast their show from their spaceship-turned-television studio.

Format
Every episode typically begins with Ned facing some sort of issue or becoming intrigued by an average, every day cultural phenomenon such as sports, pets, or dreams. He will banter with Cornelius and BETI before starting up the show. Cornelius will introduce the first guest, who is usually seen getting beamed into a waiting room (apparently while they were in the middle of some other activity) and will converse with BETI before arriving on set. Sometimes depending on what Ned is up against, the guest will come straight to the set. Ned will go into the guest's background before segueing into the subject at hand. Sometimes Ned will have them play a game, or have the guest do something relating to their craft, though this is not always the case.

After the first guest is sent home, Ned will send Cornelius to the surface to learn more about the episode's subject. Cornelius will usually interact with a professional of some kind and occasionally will interact with another well known celebrity. Sometimes, Ned will instead play a video or Cornelius will be sent to fulfill a task of some kind instead. Afterwards, he is brought back where Ned brings on the second guest, who is immediately brought to the set. Once again, Ned goes through a similar interviewing set up and will sometimes have them play a game or not.

After the second guest is sent home, Ned will close the show out. A coda usually appears at the end with Ned recording a status report of his supposed conquering of Earth which consists of him claiming that something went wrong and that he has to delay the attack. He instead talks about what he has learned about Earth's culture. It is implied that he is trying to subconsciously convince his superiors and his father that Earth is not bad and should be spared.

Characters
 Ned (performed by Paul Rugg) - The 437-year-old spaceship captain and talk show host from an as-yet-unidentified alien race. He was tasked with leading an assault on Earth, but fell in love with the culture and decided to start a talk show instead. His father is the admiral in charge of their conquering of the galaxy and it is heavily implied throughout the first season that he has a troubled relationship with him. Ned is egotistical and brash, but very curious nonetheless and wants to be informed of all things earth-related. He considers Ben Schwartz to be his arch-nemesis because in the future, he steals his show. His favorite earth "cuisine" is mayonnaise. Paul Rugg is assisted in performing Ned by Morgana Ignis, Donna Kimball, Allan Trautman (who leads the animatronic performance), and Jack Venturo.
 Cornelius (performed by Michael Oosterom) - The lieutenant and talk show co-host. He comes from a race of aliens called Cornisians who have always served Ned's species ever since Ned's kind conquered the Cornisians' homeworld. He takes to the idea of being a co-host for Ned's show and will introduce the guests. Cornelius often gets sent to the surface to perform field reporting, which usually results in him getting absorbed into the complexities of the subject at hand. He is slightly inept, but witty and makes humorous comebacks when Ned insults him. Michael Oosterom is assisted in performing Cornelius by Nicolette Santino (who operates the left-hand) and Drew Massey.
 BETI (voiced by Colleen Smith) - The spaceship's artificial intelligence. She is a charge of energy that powers the ship and doubles as a computer that can glean information. She is sarcastic and cynical and is not above belittling Ned and Cornelius's intelligence. At one point, she felt insulted when guest Thomas Lennon corrected her about American Gothic. She typically appears on a giant screen behind the set.
 CLODs (performed by Jack Venturo and Victor Yerrid) - Short for Cloned Living Organism of Destruction, they are a group of small monster-like creatures that can eat mostly any material and speak in unintelligible grunts and growls.

Additional characters performed by Grant Baciocco, Greg Ballora, Kevin Carlson, Raymond Carr, Kevin Clash, Dorien Davies, Alice Dinnean, Artie Esposito, Peggy Etra, Genevieve Flati, Dan Garza, Patrick Johnson, Sean Johnson, Tim Lagasse, Amanda Maddock, Paul McGinnis, Sarah Sarang Oh, and Russ Walko.

Production
Executive produced by Brian Henson (son of Jim Henson) and Vince Raisa (a Jim Henson Company veteran), Earth to Ned combines expert puppeteering with witty banter and carefully selected guest appearances. Henson remarked that the show had been something he had been working on for years and was based on the interesting concept of someone or something wholly unfamiliar with humans trying to figure them out. Because the episodes are available at any time of day and therefore accessible to viewers of all ages, Henson focused on making the content family friendly.

The character of Ned requires four puppeteers and two other operators,  while Cornelius requires three puppeteers. All of the puppets are fully animatronic, with no CGI involved.

Henson revealed that almost none of the interview segments are scripted, with Ned, Cornelius and the guests for each episode improvising the conversation for the various talk show segments.

Episodes

Reception
As of October 4, 2020 (one month after appearing online), Earth to Ned held a 83% rating on Rotten Tomatoes.

New York magazine's blog, Vulture, in praising Earth to Ned called it, "A Joyful Answer To Our Darkest Worry".

According to Robert Lloyd's positive review of Earth to Ned in the Los Angeles Times he said titled his piece, "Restore Your Faith In Humanity With Disney+'s Alien Talk Show, Earth To Ned". and he later placed the show on his top 10 list of television shows in 2020.

According to Paste, Earth to Ned was ranked 14th in their top 2020 funniest shows of 2020 list as well as a top 5 late night show.

References

External links

2020 American television series debuts
2021 American television series endings
American television shows featuring puppetry
Disney+ original programming
English-language television shows
Improvisational television series
Television series about alien visitations
Television series by The Jim Henson Company
Television series by Disney